Statistics of Libyan Premier League in season 2000.

Overview
It was contested by 15 teams, and Al-Ahly (Tripoli) won the championship.

Group stage

Group A

Group B

Final
Al-Ahly (Tripoli) 1-0 Al-Hilal (Benghazi)

References
Libya - List of final tables (RSSSF)

Libyan Premier League seasons
1
Libya
Libya